Copiapó Province is one of three provinces of the northern Chilean region of Atacama (III). Its capital is the city of Copiapó.

Geography and demography
It is the tenth largest province in the country. Between the 1992 and 2002 censuses, the population grew by 24.9% (31,021 persons).

Administration
As a province, Copiapó is a second-level administrative division of Chile, which is further divided into three communes (comunas). The province is administered by a presidentially appointed regional delegate.

Communes
Copiapó
Caldera
Tierra Amarilla

References

Provinces of Atacama Region
Provinces of Chile